Chakfazal is a village in Tehsil: Kharian, District : Gujrat in the province: Punjab of Pakistan. There are approximately 200 to 250 houses. Mostly cast of population is Jat and clan is Babbar.Its population is approximately 1500.It is situated 25 km far from Kharian and 30 km from Gujrat. 
Its nearest city is Kotla Arab Ali Khan. Chakfazal is 5 km far from Kotla Arab Ali Khan City.

Surrounding villages 
There are many other villages around Chakfazal, Detail is as under:
East: Kotla Arab Ali Khan ,
West: Gotriala, Sadwalcity
North: Japur, Murarian
South: Parlay Kithay, Sarria, Mathana Chak, Sheikpur,

Satellite view 
Satellite Map by wiki        kalu chak  kanian

References

link Satellite Map by wikimapia.org

Populated places in Gujrat District